Edwin Zbonek (28 March 1928 – 29 May 2006) was an Austrian film director and screenwriter. He directed 14 films between 1960 and 1982. His film Man and Beast was entered into the 13th Berlin International Film Festival.

Selected filmography
  (1960)
  (1962)
 Man and Beast (1963)
  (1963)
 The Monster of London City (1964)
  (1965)
  (1965)

References

External links
 

Austrian film directors
Austrian television directors
Austrian male screenwriters
German-language film directors
People from Linz
1928 births
2006 deaths
20th-century Austrian screenwriters
20th-century Austrian male writers